Diósjenő is a village in Nógrád county, Hungary. It is surrounded by hills.

History
The village was first mentioned in 1282.  Its name comes from Jenő, the name of one of the seven tribes conquering present-day Hungary, while the word "diós" refers to walnut trees. The Hussites built a castle in the village. After the Ottoman era, in 1720 30 houses stood in the village.

Tourist sights
 Roman Catholic church: built in the 15th century in Gothic style; rebuilt in 1788-89 in Baroque and Neoclassical style.
 Protestant church: built around 1850 in late Neoclassical style.
 Five bridges on the Jenő stream, built between 1914 and 1930 of stone, bricks and ferroconcrete.

Famous people
 István Szentgyörgyi, actor (1842–1931)

External links
 Official site 
 Association site 

Populated places in Nógrád County
Neoclassical architecture in Hungary